Taunggyi Bird Sanctuary is a protected area in Myanmar's Shan Hills at an elevation of . It was established in 1906 under the name Taunggyi Wildlife Reserve and was redesignated as bird sanctuary in 1989.

References

External links

Protected areas of Myanmar
Protected areas established in 2005
Shan Hills